Vukan is a Serbian male given name that may refer to:

Vukan of Rascia, the Grand Prince of Serbia 1083 - 1112
Stefan Vukan, nephew of Grand Prince Vukan
Vukan Nemanjić, the King of Serbia 1202 - 1204
Vukan Perović (b. 1952), Yugoslav footballer

See also
House of Vukanović, the Dynasty named after Grand Prince Vukan
Vukan Gospels, a gospel book of Vukan Nemanjić
Vuk (name) (English equivalent Wolf (name))
Vukašin, Serbian given name
Slavic names

Serbian masculine given names
Slavic masculine given names